Bloodshot is the 17th studio release, and 15th full-length studio album, by Christian alternative rock band the Choir, released on June 1, 2018. This album was funded by the band's PledgeMusic campaign launched in January 2017, which also generated a remastered and reissued release of Wide-Eyed Wonder.

Critical reception

Critical reviews for Bloodshot were positive, even though the downbeat nature of the lyrics was consistently noted. Alex Caldwell from Jesus Freak Hideout said, "you aren't likely to hear a heartbreaking subject like divorce treated with this level of transparency from a standpoint of faith in many places. Bloodshot is a heartbreaking and moving listen, with a veteran band's level of attention to detail." John Underdown, in a second review, agreed: "the songs grow on the listener with each spin and the depth of the writing is compelling with great use of imagery," while Brian Q. Newcomb from The Fire Note pointed out that "the music here is more high energy and positive sounding than you would expect with this content." Jerry Wilson from Cephas Hour summed up Bloodshot as "the most straightforward album The Choir has ever recorded", calling the songs "simpler without being simplistic: more direct, more immediately accessible.”

Track listing
All lyrics by Steve Hindalong. All music by Derri Daugherty, except where noted.

Personnel 
The Choir
Derri Daugherty - Lead vocals, electric guitar
Steve Hindalong - Drums, percussion, vocals, lead vocals ("The Way You Always Are")
Tim Chandler - Bass guitar
Dan Michaels - Saxophone, lyricon

Guest performers
Stephen Leiweke - Acoustic guitar, electric guitar, keyboards
Matt Slocum - cello and string arrangements
David Davidson - violin
Steve Mason - vocals
Mason Zgoda - vocals ("Bloodshot Eyes")
Jeff Alkire - Arco bass ("The Dizzy Wounded")
Jason Ames - Cowbell ("Californians On Ice")
Brad Behrens - Electric guitar ("Birds, Bewildered")
Dith Yoder - Electric guitar ("The Way You Always Are")
Jim Schreck - Electric guitar, loops (ambient loop) ("Because You’re Beautiful")
Cate Yoder - Piano ("The Time Has Come")
Matt Strange - Piano ("Magic")
Kayla Anderson - Ukulele, vocals ("We've Got the Moon")

Production
Producer - Stephen Leiweke
Executive producers - Jason Ames, Dan Michaels, Lisa Michaels
Handler - Lisa Michaels
Mixer - Shane Wilson
Recorded by Stephen Leiweke, Derri Daugherty

References

2013 albums
The Choir (alternative rock band) albums
Galaxy21 Music albums